The British Railways (BR) ex-WD Austerity 2-10-0 Class was a class of 25 2-10-0 steam locomotives of the WD Austerity 2-10-0 type purchased in 1948 from the War Department.

Operational history
BR officially listed them in their running stock in 1948, though most were kept in store until 1949–1950.  BR allocated them the numbers 90750–74.  They were used to haul heavy freight trains and were mostly allocated to Scottish Region ex-LMS (Caledonian) motive power depots in the Central Belt, Motherwell and Grangemouth always being their principal bases, where they were mixed with the much more widespread WD 2-8-0s.  They were withdrawn after about 12 years service between 1961 and 1962. In addition to the above engines, another WD Austerity 2-10-0 Longmoor Military Railway 601 Kitchener (original WD No. 73797) was hired from the War Department between 1957 and 1959.

Names
Both 90773 and 90774 were named North British after the North British Locomotive Company which built them (the last of the BR ex-WD Austerity 2-8-0s No. 90732 was similarly named Vulcan after the Vulcan Foundry).  As one of 49 LNER Peppercorn Class A1s, No. 60161, was also named North British, BR had three locomotives with this name, though the A1 was named after the North British Railway rather than the engineering firm.

Classification
They were given the power classification 8F. BR considered them as standard locomotives, numbering them in the numbering series reserved for BR standard engines and assigning them the boiler No. BR11.  The tenders were given the classification BR5.

Stock list

Withdrawal 
Withdrawals started in 1961 and continued at a reasonable pace before the remaining 17 were withdrawn en masse in December 1962.

Preservation 
None of the BR engines was preserved.  However, there is a "90775" running in Great Britain which was repatriated from Greece, formerly being WD No.76352, SEK No. Lb951. It is based on the North Norfolk Railway. Ex-WD No. 3672 Dame Vera Lynn, which is under overhaul at North Yorkshire Moors Railway, has been repatriated from Greece as well. There is also ex-WD LMR 600 Gordon which has survived and has been steamed on the Severn Valley Railway, though since 2008 it has been out of service, cosmetically restored and on display in Highley Engine House.

See Also
BR ex-WD Austerity 2-8-0

References

WD Austerity 2-10-0
Standard gauge steam locomotives of Great Britain
Railway locomotives introduced in 1945
War Department locomotives
NBL locomotives
Vulcan Foundry locomotives
Railway locomotives introduced in 1943
Steam locomotives of the Netherlands
Steam locomotives of Sweden
Standard gauge locomotives of the Netherlands
Standard gauge locomotives of Sweden
Scrapped locomotives